St Mary's Church is an English parish church in the town of Ferndown.

History
Built in 1933, on land given in 1932, with the chancel and sanctuary added in 1939, transept and vestries added in 1966, and tower completed in 1972. A church hall complex was added in 1982.

References

External links

Church of England church buildings in Dorset